St. Astvatsatsin Monastery or Kusakan Monastery was an Armenian monastery located in the village of Shurud (Julfa District) of the Nakhchivan Autonomous Republic of Azerbaijan. The monastery was located approximately 1 km north of the village.

History 
The founding date of the monastery is unknown. It was rebuilt in 1631.

Architecture 
The monastery was a single-chamber nave structure. There were wall paintings adorning the building as well as there were 17th-century carved cross-stones (khachkars) decorating the front of the bema. There were Armenian inscriptions on the interior.

Destruction 
The monastery was damaged but still standing in the late Soviet period, however it was razed to ground at some point between 1997 and June 15, 2006, as documented by investigation of the Caucasus Heritage Watch.

References 

Armenian churches in Azerbaijan
Ruins in Azerbaijan